Bansulab-e Nam Khas (also Romanized as Bānsūlāb-e Nām Khāş; also known as Bānsūlāb-e Nāvkhāş) is a village in Qalkhani Rural District, Gahvareh District, Dalahu County, Kermanshah Province, Iran. At the 2006 census, its population was 40, in 10 families.

References 

Populated places in Dalahu County